The schilling (German: Schilling) was the currency of Austria from 1925 to 1938 and from 1945 to 1999, and the circulating currency until 2002. The euro was introduced at a fixed parity of  €1 = 13.7603 schilling to replace it. The schilling was divided into 100 groschen.

History
Following the Carolingian coin reform in AD 794, new units of account were introduced including the schilling which consisted of 12 silver pfennigs. It was initially only a coin of account but later became an actual coin produced in many European countries.

Before the modern Austrian schilling
The currencies predating the schilling include:
 The florin, in existence as a currency of the Holy Roman Empire since the 16th century, divided into 8 Schillings = 60 Kreuzer = 240 Pfennigs
 The Austro-Hungarian gulden after 1857, divided into 100 Neukreuzer
 The Austro-Hungarian krone, introduced in 1892 upon adoption of the gold standard; and
 The Austrian crown, introduced for Austria in 1919 upon the dissolution of the Austro-Hungarian Empire.

In mediaeval Austria there were short and long schilling coins, valued at 12  and 30 pfennigs respectively. Until 1857, the schilling was a currency unit for 30 pfennigs or  kreuzers. The Austrian groschen (also known as the Kaisergroschen, lit. “emperor's groschen/groat”) was a silver coin worth 12 pfennigs = 3 kreuzers =  schillings.

First Austrian schilling
The schilling was established by the Schilling Act (Schillingrechnungsgesetz) of 20 December 1924, at a rate of one schilling to 10,000 kronen and issued on 1 March 1925. The schilling was abolished in the wake of Germany's annexation of Austria in 1938, when it was exchanged at a rate of 1.50 schilling for one Reichsmark.

Second Austrian schilling
The schilling was reintroduced after World War II on 30 November 1945 by the Allied Military, who issued paper money (dated 1944) in denominations of 50 groschen, 2, 5, 10, 20, 25, 50, 100, and 1000 schilling. The exchange rate to the reichsmark was 1:1, limited to 150 schilling per person. The Nationalbank also began issuing schilling notes in 1945 and the first coins were issued in 1946.

With a second "schilling" law on 21 November 1947, new banknotes were introduced. The earlier notes could be exchanged for new notes at par for the first 150 schilling and at a rate of 1 new schilling for 3 old schillings thereafter. Coins were not affected by this reform. The currency stabilised in the 1950s, with the schilling being tied to the U.S. dollar at a rate of $1 = 26 schilling. Following the breakdown of the Bretton Woods system in 1971, the schilling was initially tied to a basket of currencies until July 1976, when it was coupled to the German mark.

Although the euro became the official currency of Austria in 1999, euro coins and notes were not introduced until 2002. Old schilling denominated coins and notes were phased out from circulation because of the introduction of the euro by 28 February of that year. Schilling banknotes and coins which were valid at the time of the introduction of the euro will indefinitely remain exchangeable for euros at any branch of the Oesterreichische Nationalbank.

Coins

First schilling
In 1925, bronze 1 and 2 groschen, cupro-nickel 10 groschen, and silver  and 1 schilling coins were introduced, followed by cupro-nickel 5 groschen issues in 1931. In 1934, cupro-nickel 50 groschen and 1 schilling were introduced, together with silver 5 schilling. Coins were issued until 1938.

Also issued gold and silver coins: 2 schillings (1937) – 64% silver, 5 schillings (1934) – 83% silver, 25 schillings (1926) – 90% gold, 100 schillings (1924) – 90% gold.

Second schilling
Between 1947 and 1952, coins in denominations of 1, 2, 5, 10, 20, and 50 groschen; and 1, 2, and 5 schilling were introduced. The 1, 5, 10, and 50 groschen were initially made from leftover blanks from the wartime pfennig issues. The 2 and 50 groschen; 1, 2, and 5 schilling were struck in aluminium, as was the second type of 10 groschen coin. The 1 and 5 groschen and the first type of 10 groschen were in zinc, with the 20 groschen struck in aluminium-bronze. The 1 groschen was only struck in 1947, while the 20 groschen and 2 schilling coins were suspended from production in 1954 and 1952, respectively. In 1957, silver 10 schilling coins were introduced, followed in 1959 by aluminium-bronze 50 groschen and 1 schilling, and in 1960 by silver 5 schilling coins. Thus, the 5 schilling coins went from an aluminium composition to a silver one, a highly unusual event made possible by the substantial improvement of the Austrian economy in the 1950s. Cupro-nickel replaced silver in the 5 and 10 schilling coins in 1969 and 1974, respectively. An aluminium-bronze 20 schilling coin was introduced in 1980.

Silver coins were in the value of 25, 50, 100, 200 and 500 schilling, but gold coins also existed for 500 and 1,000 schilling. They were considered legal currency, but were rarely found in actual transactions.

At the time of the changeover to the euro, the coins in circulation were the following. Coins under 10 groschen were rarely seen in circulation during their final years.

 10 Schilling has pure nickel core
 Smoothly with 19 pits until 1992. In 1993, all previous 20 Schilling coins were reissued with smooth edges.

Banknotes

First schilling

In 1925, the Oesterreichische Nationalbank issued notes in denominations of 1, 5, 10, 20, 100 and 1,000 Schillinge (note the different spelling of the plural on this first 1925-series of notes).

In 1927–1929 a second series was added with 5, 10, 20, 50 and 100 schilling notes. The one schilling was substituted by a coin.

Second schilling
In 1945, the Allies introduced notes (dated 1944) in denominations of 50 groschen, 1, 2, 5, 10, 20, 25, 50, 100 and 1,000 schilling. The Oesterreichische Nationalbank also introduced notes in 1945, in denominations of 10, 20, 100 and 1,000 schilling and the allied currency with small values up to 5 schilling remained valid until 1947. With the banknote reform of 1947, new notes were issued in denominations of 5, 10, 20, 50, 100 and 1,000 schilling. 
Until 1957, the first 500 schilling banknote was issued and the 5 and 10 schilling notes were replaced by coins. However, although 20 schilling coins were issued from 1980, the 20 schilling note continued to be produced, with 5,000 schilling notes added in 1988.

See also

 Austrian euro coins
 Economy of Austria
 Edwin Grienauer
 Shilling
 Schilling (unit) - unit of coinage that preceded the Austrian schilling

References

External links

 Overview of the Austrian Schilling from the BBC
 Library of Congress Country Studies Reports
 Banknotes Austria – Pictures of nearly all Austrian shilling banknotes
 colnect - catalogue by collectors > Coins > Austria (Österreich) > 1945–2002 — 2nd Republic (Schilling) Circulation (16), built 2003–2014
 The pre-Euro banknotes of Austria 

1924 establishments in Austria
2001 disestablishments in Austria
Currencies of Austria
Currencies replaced by the euro
Economic history of Austria
Modern obsolete currencies